Alfonso Cardoso (born Montevideo, 27 December 1971) is a Uruguayan former rugby union player. He played as a fullback.

Career
For his club rugby, Cardoso played for Old Boys, and regularly represented them at the Punta Del Este Sevens.

He earned 42 caps for Uruguay, from 1996 to 2003, with 14 tries and 1 conversion, 71 points in aggregate.
He played twice at the Rugby World Cup finals, in 1999 and 2003. He was capped three times at the first presence, scoring a try, and two times at the second, again scoring a try.

References

External links
Alfonso Cardoso International Statistics

1971 births
Living people
Rugby union players from Montevideo
Uruguayan rugby union players
Uruguay international rugby union players
Rugby union fullbacks
People educated at The British Schools of Montevideo